Agelena babai is a species of spider in the family Agelenidae, which contains at least 1,315 species of funnel-web spiders . It was described by Akio Tanikawa in 2005. It is endemic to Japan.

References

babai
Spiders of Asia
Chelicerates of Japan
Endemic fauna of Japan
Spiders described in 2005